José Gildeixon Clemente de Paiva (3 September 1987 – 28 November 2016), commonly known as Gil, was a Brazilian footballer who last played for Chapecoense as a defensive midfielder.

Gil was one of the victims when LaMia Airlines Flight 2933 crashed on 28 November 2016.

Club career
Gil started his career at Santa Cruz-RN. In 2005, he joined Mogi Mirim after impressing on a trial, and subsequently became an undisputed starter for the side. He then had spells at Guaratinguetá and Série A club Vitória in 2009, making his division debut for the latter on 16 July in a 1–1 away draw against Náutico.

Released by Vitória in December 2009, Gil signed for Santo André in Série B. Sparingly used by the club during the season, he moved to fellow second tier club Ponte Preta.

In April 2011, after impressing in the year's Campeonato Paulista, Gil agreed to a contract with Coritiba, but was only registered in June. He made his debut for the club on 1 July, replacing Tcheco in a 3–1 home victory against Ceará.

After several campaigns as a starter, Gil was loaned to fellow top tier side Chapecoense on 3 January 2015. He scored his first goal in the category on 30 May, but in a 1–3 loss at former club Ponte Preta.

Gil rescinded his contract with Coxa in December 2015, and signed for Chape permanently.

Death
On 28 November 2016, whilst at the service of Chapecoense, Gil was among the fatalities of the LaMia Airlines Flight 2933 accident in the Colombian village of Cerro Gordo, La Unión, Antioquia.

Career statistics

Honours
Coritiba
Campeonato Paranaense: 2012, 2013

Chapecoense
Campeonato Catarinense: 2016
Copa Sudamericana: 2016 (posthumously)

References

External links

1987 births
2016 deaths
Sportspeople from Rio Grande do Norte
Brazilian footballers
Association football midfielders
Campeonato Brasileiro Série A players
Campeonato Brasileiro Série B players
Santa Cruz Futebol Clube players
Mogi Mirim Esporte Clube players
Guaratinguetá Futebol players
Esporte Clube Vitória players
Esporte Clube Santo André players
Associação Atlética Ponte Preta players
Coritiba Foot Ball Club players
Associação Chapecoense de Futebol players
Footballers killed in the LaMia Flight 2933 crash